Stefan Kaiser (born 3 March 1956 in Cologne, Germany) is a German sculptor.

Artistic career 
After finishing school, Kaiser began an apprenticeship as a stonemason and stone sculptor at the Dombauhütte affiliated to Cologne Cathedral in 1974. Subsequently, from 1977 to 1978 he was a freelancer and student of the sculptor Elmar Hillebrand (1925-2016). After obtaining his technical college entrance qualification, he began his studies at the Technical University of Cologne in 1980 in the sculpture class of Hans Karl Burgeff, which he completed in 1985. Kaiser began to exhibit his works during his studies and accepted commissions from churches and private clients. Since 1978, he has been a freelance artist in his own studio and sculpture garden in the south of Cologne, where he organizes cultural events under the name "Kaiser-Skulpturen" once a months from April to October.

Work 
Kaiser calls his characteristic work "Architektonische Plastik" (Architectural Sculpture), which comprises his sculptural examination of the "interweaving of the horizontal and the vertical with the penetration of spatial bodies". He works with classical sculptural materials such as tuff stone, sandstone, shell limestone, Savonnier limestone, terracotta, plaster and bronze. His bronze sculptures are made using the bronze casting technique developed by Elmar Hillebrand. Kaiser's work is also characterized by its figurative sculpture, as it is used in sacral contexts, exemplified in the churches of St. George's in Köln-Weiß (Cologne) and St. Maternus' and St. Joseph's in Köln-Rodenkirchen (Cologne). Kaiser made four of the 106 Cologne Council Tower figures, which show Sulpiz Boisserée (1784-1854), Georg Simon Ohm (1784-1854), Peter Heinrich Merkens (1777-1854) and Rupert von Deutz (c. 1065-1129).

Publicly accessible works

Commissioned works by churches 
 Niche relief "Escape to Egypt" in St. George's in Cologne-Weiß
 Statue of Rochus in St. Rochus' in Bickendorf
 Statue of Joseph in St. Joseph's in Cologne-Rodenkirchen
 Baptismal font (stele and bronze lid) in Old St. Maternus' in Cologne-Rodenkirchen
 Maternus statue on the choir facade of Old St. Maternus' in Cologne-Rodenkirchen
 Nativity figures of the Three Wise Men in St. Maternus' in Cologne-Rodenkrichen
 Christusambo in St. Maria Queen in Frankenforst
Statue of St. Nicholas in the Abbey of St. Nicholas' in Brauweiler
 Statues Erpho and Kuno on the northern facade of the Abbey of St. Michael's in Siegburg
 Statue of Edith Stein in the Abbey of St. Michael's in Siegburg
 Memorial plaque for Sulpiz Boisserée in Cologne Cathedral

Commissioned works by Cologne 
 Council tower figure of Sulpiz Boisserée for the tower of the Cologne Town Hall
Council tower figure by Georg Simon Ohm for the tower of the Cologne City Hall
 Council tower figure by Peter Heinrich Merkens for the tower of the Cologne Town Hall
 Council tower figure by Rupert von Deutz for the tower of the Cologne Town Hall

Public works 
 Sculpture "Throne" in the Forest Botanical Garden, Cologne
 Monument to Johann Christoph Winters, Melaten Cemetery, Cologne
 Monument to Hermann Josef Berk, Melaten Cemetery, Cologne
 Statue of David, Lichthof in the Caritas old people's centre St. Maternus', Cologne-Rodenkirchen
 Architectural sculpture, atrium in the Caritas old people's centre St. Maternus', Cologne-Rodenkirchen

References

External links 

 Stefan Kaiser's website

German male sculptors
Stonemasons
1956 births
Living people